Bryan Pearson (30 May 1934 – 12 October 2016), nicknamed Sedluk or Salluk, meaning skinny in Inuktitut,  was a territorial level politician from the Northwest Territories, in what is now Nunavut, Canada.

Early life
Pearson was born in Liverpool, England 30 May 1934. He had two siblings, a brother - Robert and a sister - Val Pearson, who grew up in the Wirral Merseyside. 

Pearson joined the Merchant Navy when he was about 15. After working on ships in Britain and Australia he came to Canada in 1956 and went to Baffin Island. He was hired to work at the Distant Early Warning Line site on Padloping Island in the kitchen. In 1957 he moved to Apex, an Inuit community about  outside of Iqaluit, to work at the Frobisher Bay Air Base.

Beginning in the 1960s he began several businesses including the original taxi service, Astro Theatre (in 1994, the first, and as of 2016 the only cinema in Nunavut), Arctic Ventures (which he later sold to Kenn Harper). He also worked as the communities undertaker for many years and had a hearse shipped in.

Political career
In 1964, a fire in Apex motivated Pearson and others to organise the first settlement council for the community and was elected as the chairperson. Pearson was first elected to the Northwest Territories Legislature in the 1970 Northwest Territories general election. He won the electoral district of Eastern Arctic and held that district until it was abolished in the 1975 redistribution. Pearson ran for re-election and won the new Baffin South electoral district in the 1975 Northwest Territories general election. He did not return after the legislature was dissolved in 1979.

In 1979, Pearson was elected as the first mayor of Iqaluit and served several terms until 1985.

Pearson attempted a political comeback in the 1991 Northwest Territories general election running in the Iqaluit electoral district. He was defeated in a three way race by Dennis Patterson.

Later life 
After serving as an MLA, Iqaluit's first mayor and breathing life and community into Iqaluit, Pearson sold his businesses, invested his wealth into paintings, jewellery and travelled the world. He was recognised by Queen Elizabeth in a formal letter which thanked Pearson for his work.

Pearson continued to travel, return to his family in North Wales and Liverpool and support charity causes. From funding children in Brazil to go to university to supporting his local Inuit community, Pearson never stopped working for the people he loved. After being diagnosed with cancer and his return to Iqaluit which was accompanied by his family, the town rallied together to welcome him back in true Inuit style. The whole town was beeping their horns in celebration for his return home. Pearson lived out the rest of his days with his sister, brother, niece and his best friend - his dog.

Death
While on holiday in Australia he was diagnosed with pancreatic or liver cancer, which was confirmed on his return to Canada. He died at his home in Iqaluit on 12 October 2016. The town mourned his lost, Queen Elizabeth sent a letter of condolences and the Canadian territories hung the flag at half mast in Pearson’s honour. A plaque remembering Pearson is to be opened in Liverpool Cathedral, one of Bryan's favourite places.

References

1934 births
2016 deaths
Members of the Legislative Assembly of the Northwest Territories
Mayors of Iqaluit
English emigrants to Canada
People from Cheshire (before 1974)
Businesspeople from Nunavut
20th-century Canadian businesspeople